Michal Pávek (born 13 February 1985) is a Czech football player who currently plays for Ústí nad Labem.

References

External links

Guardian Football

1985 births
Living people
Czech footballers
Czech First League players
Bohemians 1905 players
FC Hradec Králové players
Loko Vltavín players
FK Ústí nad Labem players
Association football defenders